The 2010–11 SMU Mustangs men's basketball team represented Southern Methodist University in the 2010–11 NCAA Division I men's basketball season. The Mustangs, led by head coach Matt Doherty, played their home games at Moody Coliseum in Dallas, Texas, as members of Conference USA.

SMU failed to qualify for the NCAA tournament, but were invited to the 2011 CIT. The Mustangs won their first three games of the CIT to advance to the semifinals, where they were eliminated by eventual tournament champions Santa Clara, 74–66.

Roster 

Source

Schedule and results

|-
!colspan=9 style=|Regular season

|-
!colspan=9 style=| Conference USA tournament

|-
!colspan=9 style=| CollegeInsider.com tournament

Source

References

SMU Mustangs men's basketball seasons
SMU
SMU
SMU men's basketball
SMU men's basketball